Andrew Gunn may refer to:

 Andrew Gunn (director), British television director
 Andrew Gunn (film producer) (born 1969), Canadian-born American film producer